The Vehicle Assembly Building (originally the Vertical Assembly Building), or VAB, is a large building at NASA's  Kennedy Space Center (KSC), designed to assemble large pre-manufactured space vehicle components, such as the massive Saturn V, the Space Shuttle and the Space Launch System, and stack them vertically onto one of three mobile launcher platforms used by NASA. As of March 2022, the first Space Launch System (SLS) rocket was assembled inside in preparation for the Artemis 1 mission, which launched on November 16, 2022.

At , it is the eighth-largest building in the world by volume as of 2022.

The VAB is the largest single-story building in the world, was the tallest building in Florida until 1974, and is the tallest building in the United States outside an urban area.

History
The VAB, which was completed in 1966, was originally built for the vertical assembly of the Apollo–Saturn V space vehicle and was referred to as the Vertical Assembly Building. In anticipation of post-Apollo projects such as the Space Shuttle program, it was renamed the Vehicle Assembly Building on February 3, 1965. It was subsequently used to mate the Space Shuttle orbiters to their external fuel tanks and solid rocket boosters. Once the complete space vehicle was assembled on a mobile launcher platform, a crawler-transporter moved it to Launch Complex-39A or 39B.

The VAB was designated as a National Historic Civil Engineering Landmark by the American Society of Civil Engineers in 2020.

Construction

In 1963, NASA contracted Urbahn Architects to design and build the VAB. Construction began with driving the first steel foundation piles on Aug. 2, 1963. It was part of NASA's massive effort to send astronauts to the Moon for the Apollo program. Construction of the VAB required  of steel. The building was completed in 1966. Located on Florida's Atlantic coast, the building was constructed to withstand hurricanes and tropical storms. Despite this, it has received damage from several hurricanes (see below).

Capabilities

There are four entries to the bays located inside the building, which are the four largest doors in the world. A central slot at the north entry allowed for passage of the orbiter's vertical stabilizer.

To lift the components of the Space Shuttle, the VAB housed five overhead bridge cranes, including two capable of lifting 325 tons, and 136 other lifting devices.

The building has air conditioning equipment, including 125 ventilators on the roof supported by four large air handlers (four cylindrical structures west of the building) rated at a total 10,000 tons of refrigeration (120,000,000 BTU/hr, 35 MW) to keep moisture under control. Air in the building can be completely replaced every hour. The large doors can allow fog to roll into the building and become trapped, leading to incorrect rumors that the building has its own weather and can form clouds.

Exterior

The American flag painted on the building was the largest in the world when added in 1976 as part of United States Bicentennial celebrations, along with the star logo of the anniversary, later replaced by the NASA insignia in 1998.

Work began in early 2007 to restore the exterior paint on the immense facility. Special attention was paid to the enormous American flag and NASA "meatball" insignia. The work repaired visible damage from years of storms and weathering. The flag and logo had been previously repainted in 1998 for NASA's 40th anniversary.

Twenty-five additional panels were blown off the east side by the winds from Hurricane Jeanne just three weeks later. Earlier in the season, Hurricane Charley caused significant but less serious damage, estimated to cost $700,000. Damage caused by these hurricanes was still visible in 2007. Some of these panels are "punch-outs", designed to detach from the VAB when a large pressure differential is created on the outside vs. the inside. This allows for equalization, and helps protect the structural integrity of the building during rapid changes in pressure such as in tropical cyclones.

The building has been used as a backdrop in several Hollywood movies including Marooned, SpaceCamp, Apollo 13, Contact, and others.

Future

The Space Shuttle was retired in 2011 after which NASA temporarily (as early as 2012) offered public tours of the VAB. These tours were temporarily discontinued in February 2014 to allow for renovations to take place.

The NASA FY2013 budget included US$143.7 million for Construction of Facilities (CoF) requirements in support of what is now known as the Artemis program and its vehicles, including the Space Launch System (SLS) and Orion spacecraft. NASA began modifying Launch Complex 39 at KSC to support the new SLS in 2014, beginning with major repairs, code upgrades and safety improvements to the Launch Control Center, Vehicle Assembly Building (VAB) and the VAB Utility Annex. This initial work will be required to support any launch vehicle operated from Launch Complex 39 and will allow NASA to begin modernizing the facilities, while vehicle-specific requirements are being developed.

The VAB could be used to some extent for assembly and processing of any future vehicles utilizing Launch Complex 39, in addition to renovations for SLS capabilities. On June 16, 2015, NASA released an announcement for proposals (AFP) seeking interest in using the VAB High Bay 2 and other complex facilities for commercial use in "assembling, integration, and testing of launch vehicles". This move is in line with the intent to migrate KSC towards acting as a spaceport accessible to both government and commercial ventures. 

On April 21, 2016, NASA announced the selection of Orbital ATK (bought by Northrop Grumman as of 2019) to begin negotiations for High Bay 2. The "potential agreement" included an existing mobile launcher platform. NASA subsequently completed the agreement in August 2019 to lease High Bay 2 and Mobile Launcher Platform 3 to Northrop Grumman for use with their OmegA launch vehicle. However, development of OmegA was subsequently cancelled in September 2020. Northrop Grumman had yet to make any modifications to High Bay 2, and were using it for the storage of OmegA hardware. This hardware was scheduled to be removed from the VAB and returned to Northrop Grumman by the end of September 2020.

Gallery

References

External links

 
 Vehicle Assembly Building, High Bay and Low Bay at Florida's Office of Cultural and Historical Programs
 3D model of the building for use in Google Earth 

Apollo program
Artemis program
Buildings and structures in Merritt Island, Florida
Kennedy Space Center
National Register of Historic Places in Brevard County, Florida
Space Shuttle program
Buildings and structures completed in 1966
Cubic buildings
1966 establishments in Florida
Integration facilities
Historic Civil Engineering Landmarks